Mihai Pelin (25 August 1940 – 14 December 2007) was a Romanian writer and historian who was known for researching Italy's role during World War II and the history of the Romanian secret services (especially of the Securitate).

Biography

Mihai Pelin was born towards the end of August 1940 in Cernăuți, which had been occupied by the Soviet Union two months earlier. His father, Spiridon, was a railway worker while his mother was a housewife, and a part of his family had Polish and German roots. During World War II, Pelin spent his time with his grandmother in Bessarabia along with German troops, before leaving for Bucharest in 1944.

He graduated from the Faculty of Philosophy at the University of Bucharest and in his early years he was a journalist for various magazines and newspapers, including Flacăra and Scânteia Tineretului. His first written work was published in 1967, and he later moved to the city of Craiova in 1972. In 1977, at the centenary of the Romanian War of Independence (which was fought as part of the Russo-Ottoman war), he published "The fall of Plevna", which gained him a prize from the Writers' Union of Romania.

Pelin returned to Bucharest in 1981, moving into a newly finished apartment block near Obor, where he lived until his death. During the 1980s, he began researching the role of Italy in the Eastern Front of World War II, frequently travelling to cities such as Milan and Venice. He began gaining notoriety after the Romanian Revolution of 1989, when he intensified his travels to Italy and began to openly write about the history of the secret services in Romania, especially through his work "The white files of the Securitate", published in the mid 1990s. He also documented the history of Romania from the late 1930s to the early 1950s, writing books which highlighted the life of the intelligentsia of the era and the wartime efforts of the Axis.

In 2006, Pelin was named Commander of the Order of Italian Solidarity for researching into the lives and works of Italian medical staff during World War II and their humanitarian efforts, and the tales of the Italian diplomatic staff in the early communist era. He received the prize from the Italian ambassador Danielle Mancini.

A known smoker and drinker, Pelin was hospitalized during 2007 at Fundeni Hospital, where he eventually died from cirrhosis at the end of the year. His last work, whose subject was the Iași pogrom of 1941, was published posthumously in 2008.

Written works
 Redactori și pianiști, 1967
 Inaderență, 1968
 Miorița nu s-a născut lângă stele, 1973
 Căderea Plevnei, 1977
 Șa pierdută pe mare, 1983
 Speranța, 1984
 
 Epistolarul Infernului (1993)
 Sioniști sub anchetă (1993)
 Legendă și adevăr (1994)
 Istorii literare și artistice (1996)
 Cărțile albe ale Securității (1996–1997)
 Culisele spionajului românesc (1997)
 Miza războiului (1998)
 
 ARTUR – Dosarul lui Ion Caraion (2001)
 Iluziile lui Iuliu Maniu (2 vol, 2001–2002)
 
 Genii și analfabeți (2002)
 Italieni, vă ordon, treceți Prutul! (2003)
 Un veac de spionaj, contraspionaj și poliție politică (2003)
 SIE & SRI – Trecutul nu se prescrie (2004)
 Viețile pictorilor, sculptorilor și arhitecților români între legionari și staliniști (2005)
 Diplomație de război, România-Italia 1939–1945 (2005)
 Raidul escadrei trădate, 2005
 Deceniul prăbușirilor (1940–1950): viețile pictorilor, sculptorilor și arhitecților români între legionari și staliniști, 2005
 Marele rapt regal (2006)
 Săptămâna Patimilor (23-28 iunie 1940), 2008

References

External links

1940 births
2007 deaths
Writers from Chernivtsi
University of Bucharest alumni
20th-century Romanian historians
21st-century Romanian historians
20th-century Romanian male writers
21st-century Romanian male writers
Deaths from cirrhosis